The 10th Independent Battery Wisconsin Light Artillery, was an artillery battery that served in the Union Army during the American Civil War.

Service 
The 10th Independent Battery was mustered into service at New Lisbon, Wisconsin, on February 10, 1862.

The men who did not reenlist were mustered out on April 26, 1865, in Madison, Wisconsin, while the remainder were transferred to the 12th Independent Battery Wisconsin Light Artillery on April 20, 1865.

Total strength and casualties 
The 10th Independent Battery initially recruited 47 officers and men.  An additional 121 men were recruited as replacements, for a total of 168
men.

The battery suffered 3 enlisted men killed in action or died or wounds and 25 enlisted men who died of disease, for a total of 28 fatalities.

Commanders 
 Captain Yates V. Beebe

See also

 List of Wisconsin Civil War units
 Wisconsin in the American Civil War

Notes

External links 
The Civil War Archive

Military units and formations established in 1862
Military units and formations disestablished in 1865
Units and formations of the Union Army from Wisconsin
Wisconsin
1862 establishments in Wisconsin